Fred. Olsen Tenerife Bluetrail, better known simply as Tenerife Bluetrail (formerly CajaMar Tenerife Bluetrail), is an ultramarathon by mountain that offers five modalities of different characteristics for people with or without disabilities. It is celebrated every year in the month of June in the island of Tenerife (Spain). This ultramarathon began its first edition in 2011 and has since been organized by the Cabildo de Tenerife.

It is the highest race in Spain and second in Europe as a section crosses the Teide National Park (3,555 meters). For this reason, it is one of the most important sporting events in the Canary Islands and one of the races with more international repercussions, attracting runners from different parts of the country and the world.

Modalities 
The circuit offers five modes: Ultra (102 km), Trail (66 km), Marathon (43 km), Media (21 km) and Reto Bluetrail.

Repercussion 
The Tenerife Bluetrail is considered one of the most important marathons in the world. In 2017, for example, the race featured some 2,700 runners from 33 countries: Italy, Germany, United Kingdom, Argentina, Netherlands, France, Austria, Belgium, Algeria, China, Czech Republic, Finland, Hungary, Ireland, Poland, Turkey, Romania, Russia, Albania, Andorra, Australia, Chile, Denmark, Estonia, Lithuania, Montenegro, Paraguay, Portugal, Switzerland, Uruguay and Uzbekistan.

Featured runners 
 Sangé Sherpa (Nepal, 1981), winner of the Cajamar Tenerife Bluetrail of 2016.
 María Lorena Ramírez (Mexico, 1995), background runner of the Tarahumara or Rarámuri ethnic group.

References

External links 
 Official Website

Marathons in Europe
Athletics competitions in Spain
Sport in Tenerife
Ultramarathons
Marathons in Spain
2011 establishments in the Canary Islands
Recurring sporting events established in 2011